The Men's mass start event of the Biathlon World Championships 2015 was held on 15 March 2015. 30 athletes participated over a course of 15 km.

Results
The race was started at 17:15 EET.

References

Men's mass start